The Sar is a river in Galicia, Spain. Rising near Santiago de Compostela, it flows through the A Maía valley for over  before entering the Ulla River, near Padron.

Pomponius Mela (d. 45 AD) mentions it (Sars) in De situ orbis libri III. Galician local poet Rosalía de Castro wrote a well-known collection titled En las Orillas del Sar ("On the Banks of the Sar"), in Castilian Spanish.

See also 
 List of rivers of Spain
 Rivers of Galicia

External links

Rivers of Spain
Rivers of Galicia (Spain)